Ecuador competed at the 1988 Summer Olympics in Seoul, South Korea. Thirteen competitors, ten men and three women, took part in fifteen events in six sports.

Competitors
The following is the list of number of competitors in the Games.

Athletics

Men's 10,000 metres
 Rolando Vera
 Heat — 28:17.88
 Final — 28:17.64 (→ 15th place)

Men's Triple Jump
José Quiñaliza
 Qualifying Round — 15.86 (→ did not advance, 25th place)

Men's Decathlon 
 Fidel Solórzano — DNF (→ no ranking)
 100 metres — 11.01s
 Long Jump — 6.79m
 Shot Put — 11.76m
 High Jump — 1.88m
 400 metres — DNS

Women's 400 metres
Liliana Chalá
 Heat — 53.74
 Quarterfinals — 53.83 (→ did not advance)

Women's 100m Hurdles
Nancy Vallecilla
 Heat — 13.97 (→ did not advance)

Women's 400m Hurdles
Liliana Chalá
 Heat — 57.15 (→ did not advance)

Boxing

 Segundo Mercado

Cycling

One male cyclist represented Ecuador in 1988.

Men's sprint
 Nelson Mario Pons

Men's 1 km time trial
 Nelson Mario Pons

Diving

 Abraham Suárez

Shooting 

 Inés Margraff
 Hugo Romero

Taekwondo

 Pascual Pacheco
 Francisco Cevallos
 Fernando Jaramillo

Weightlifting

 Joe García Edwin Mata
 Jhon Sichel

References

External links
Ecuador Olympic Committee

Nations at the 1988 Summer Olympics
1988
Olymp